The Great Council of Chiefs was a formal assembly of Fiji's senior hereditary chiefs (including Sitiveni Rabuka who led the 1987 Fijian coups d'état), along with some representatives of the national government and provincial councils, who may or may not be hereditary chiefs themselves. It also had a constitutional role in functioning as an electoral college to choose the President of the Republic, as well as 14 of the 32 Senators.

Following the adoption of the ministerial system of government in 1967, the Minister for Fijian Affairs (the Cabinet Minister responsible for indigenous cultural and economic development) presided over the Great Council of Chiefs. This arrangement continued until the constitutional changes of 1999, when the Great Council chose its own Chairman for the first time. The Great Council was disestablished in 2012.

The following tables list the Fijian Affairs Ministers from 1967 to 1999, and Chairmen of the Great Council of Chiefs since that date.

Ministers for Fijian Affairs (1967–1999) 
Ministers of Fijian Affairs since 1999 are not included, as they no longer preside over the Great Council.  If the Minister was simultaneously the Prime Minister, this is indicated by an asterisk.

Chairmen of the Great Council of Chiefs (1999–2012) 
Since 1999, when the Council chose its own chairman for the first time, the following individuals have held the office. In April 2007, the council was suspended by "interim prime minister" and military leader Frank Bainimarama, who had taken power in a coup in December 2006. In February 2008, Bainimarama announced that he was appointing himself chairman of the council. In early August 2008, it was announced that the Great Council of Chiefs was ready to reconvene. It would be chaired by the Minister for Fijian Affairs - namely, at that time, Commodore Bainimarama. In October 2008, Ratu Epeli Nailatikau was named Minister of Indigenous (Fijian) Affairs, and therefore also Chairman of the Great Council of Chiefs.

In April 2009, Nailatikau was appointed Vice-President of Fiji.

References

Fijian nobility
Government of Fiji
Fiji, Chairmen of the Great Council of Chiefs
Politics of Fiji
Chairman of the Great Council of Chiefs
1967 establishments in Fiji
2012 disestablishments in Fiji